This is a list of weapons, vehicles and aircraft used by the Swiss Army at present or in the past.

Small arms

Weapons marked in bold are considered personal equipment of the soldier, who is responsible for their well-functioning and were required to keep them at home until the end of the military service (unless living near an external border of Switzerland). In 2010, the regulation that allowed members of the Swiss militia to keep their assigned personal weapon in their home was amended, and now allows members of the militia to voluntarily deposit their issued firearm in an armory. Between brackets is the number of such weapons in personal equipment as of 31 January 2009. Swiss Army knives are also issued, but are not considered weapons.

Individual weapons
 Sturmgewehr 90 assault rifle + bayonet (200,000)
 Sturmgewehr 07 assault rifle (Swiss Grenadiers, ARD 10, FSK-17, Military Police)
 Pistole 75 semi-automatic pistol (30,000)
 Pistole 03 semi-automatic pistol (Military Police)
 Glock 17 / 19 semi-automatic pistols (Swiss Grenadiers, ARD 10, FSK-17, Military Police)
 FN Minimi (5.6mm Leichtes Maschinengewehr 05)
 Heckler & Koch MP5-A5 submachine gun (Military Police)
Heckler & Koch MP5-SD submachine gun (ARD 10)
 Remington 870 multipurpose shotgun (Mehrzweckgewehr 91)
Sako TRG-42 8.6 mm anti-personnel sniper rifle (8.6mm Scharfschützengewehr 04) (196)
PGM Hécate II 12.7 mm anti-materiel heavy sniper rifle (12.7mm Präzisionsgewehr 04) (20)

Crew served weapons
 MG 51 machine gun
Browning M2 Heavy machine gun (Mg 64)
Ammunition provided by Saab Bofors Dynamics Switzerland Ltd. ESG provides the fire control system TARANIS® Swiss Mortar System (TSMS). The purchase of 300 mortars was approved by the parliament in 2019.
60mm mortar

Other weapons
 Gewehraufsatz 97 40mm grenade launcher (mounted under "Sturmgewehr 90" assault rifle for grenadiers and fusiliers)
 HG 85 hand grenade
 Panzerfaust 3 shoulder-launched recoilless anti-tank weapon
H&K P2A1 flare pistol (26.5mm Rakp 78)
 BGM-71 TOW
 FIM-92 Stinger
 NLAW
 MATADOR

Vehicles

Aircraft

Communication
R-905 microwave transmission station

Former equipment

References

 Betriebsanleitung Entpannungspanzer 65 (1972) K + W (Hrsg.): Entpannungspanzer 65 Betriebsanleitung. Nur für den dienstlichen Gebrauch. Auflage von 1972. K+W (Eidgenössische Konstruktionswerkstätte) - Thun(Entpannungspanzer 65 Operating Instructions. Only for official use. Edition of 1972. K+W (Swiss design workshops) - Thun)
 Book Die Panzer der Schweizer Armee von 1920 bis 2008, Urs Heller (2008) 
 Book Fahrzeuge der Schweizer Armee von 1900 bis 2020, Markus Hofmann, Max Martin and Christoph Zimmerli (2020), ISBN 978-3-033-07130-8, . Presented are all military vehicles, which served in the Swiss Army from 1900 until 2020.
 Military Museum Full-Reuenthal, Switzerland 

 
Swiss Armed Forces
Swiss military-related lists